The Dust Bowl is a 2012 American television documentary miniseries directed by Ken Burns which aired on PBS on November 18 and 19, 2012. The four-part miniseries recounts the impact of the Dust Bowl on the United States during the Great Depression of the 1930s.

The series features the voices of Patricia Clarkson, Peter Coyote, and Carolyn McCormick.

Episodes
Episode One: The Great Plow-Up
Episode Two: Dust to Eat
Episode Three: Reaping the Whirlwind
Episode Four:  The Hardy Ones

Other uses
Interviews from the documentary were used in the 2014 film Interstellar, that deals with massive dust storms in a near future.

Critical reception 
The Dust Bowl has received generally positive reviews from television critics and parents of young children. Robert Lloyd of the Los Angeles Times wrote, "Timely...exceptional." Historians on the other hand raised concerns about some of the evidence and research ignored by the film makers.

See also
Caroline Henderson
Sanora Babb – works referenced in series
American Experience (season 10) – Surviving the Dust Bowl aired on PBS in 1998
The Plow That Broke the Plains (1936 documentary by Pare Lorentz)

References

External links
Series's official website at PBS

Video Preview at PBS
PBS press release announcing The Dust Bowl (April 11, 2012)

2010s American documentary television series
Works about the Dust Bowl